The Blackout All-Stars was a one-off 1994 Latin supergroup consisting of Ray Barretto, Sheila E., Tito Puente, Tito Nieves, Paquito D'Rivera, Dave Valentin, Grover Washington Jr., and Tony Pabon.

The group released one single, "I Like It" (sung originally by Pete Rodriguez), originally recorded and included in the soundtrack for the 1994 film I Like It Like That. The song's popularity was later renewed due to its inclusion in a Burger King commercial in 1996 and peaked at No. 25 on the Billboard Hot 100 the following year.

Other members
Jose “Ite” Jerez (trumpet)
Luis Disla (baritone saxophone)
William Cepeda (trombone)
Ruben Rodriguez (bass)

Discography
Singles
1994/1996: "I Like It Like That" No. 25 U.S.

References

Latin jazz musicians
Musical groups established in 1994
Musical groups disestablished in 1994
Jazz supergroups
Puerto Rican musical groups
American jazz ensembles from New York City
1994 establishments in the United States